Boiki Mothibi is a Botswanan former footballer who played as a striker. He won one cap for the Botswana national football team in 2004.

External links
 

Living people
Association football forwards
Botswana footballers
Extension Gunners FC players
Botswana international footballers
Mogoditshane Fighters players
Year of birth missing (living people)